Riverhead Central School District is a public school district located in the eastern part of Suffolk County, New York, United States.

The total enrollment for the 2022-2023 school year was 5,245 students.

Schools

High schools
 Riverhead High School - The 33rd and current location of the Riverhead High School.

Intermediate Schools
 Riverhead Middle School (7-8 grade). 
 Pulaski Street School (5-6 grade).  Was built in 1938 and was the 21st location of the Riverhead High School.

Elementary schools
 Aquebogue Elementary School (K-4).  Building originally constructed in 1929.
 Phillips Avenue School (K-4)
 Riley Avenue School (K-4)
 Roanoke Avenue School (K-4). Building originally built in 1922 and was the 1st location of the Riverhead Library.

References

External links
 Riverhead Central School District

Riverhead (town), New York
Education in Suffolk County, New York
School districts in New York (state)